Michał Pazdan (born 21 September 1987) is a Polish professional footballer who plays as a centre-back for Jagiellonia Białystok.

Club career
Pazdan began his football career at Hutnik Kraków. He gradually made his way up the ranks and became part of the main team in the 2003–04 season.

In 2007, he joined Górnik Zabrze. He debuted in the Ekstraklasa on 14 September 2007 with Jagiellonia Białystok against Polonia Bytom. During that season he appeared 19 times for the club, 17 of those as a starter, and helped his team finish in 8th place that season.

On 24 June 2015, Pazdan joined Legia Warsaw.

On 29 January 2019, Pazdan signed two-year deal with Ankaragücü.

International career
Pazdan has earned 35 caps for the Poland national team. He made his debut on 15 December 2007 in a 1–0 friendly win against Bosnia and Herzegovina.

Poland manager, Leo Beenhakker, called him up to participate in the 23-man squad at Euro 2008, however, along with Łukasz Garguła, he was the only player not to have played a single minute.

As of late, Pazdan has only been called up as a reserve for any players that may get injured, he was, however, called up on 21 November 2008 for friendly matches in Antalya, Turkey.

During Euro 2016, Pazdan became a national hero after the game against World Champions, Germany, where he was pronounced as Man of the match and led the team to a draw, which helped Poland to qualify for the knockout stages of the tournament for the first time in history. His performances also led to reported interest from Premier League clubs. Poland then beat Switzerland on penalties to qualify for the quarter finals; however, Pazdan and the Polish defence conceded their first goal of the tournament to Xherdan Shaqiri.

In May 2018 he was named in Poland's preliminary 35-man squad for the 2018 FIFA World Cup in Russia.

Career statistics

Club

International

Honours
Legia Warsaw
Ekstraklasa: 2015–16, 2016–17, 2017–18
Polish Cup: 2015–16, 2017–18

Individual
FIFA San Miguel Cup Team of the Tournament: 2009
Polski Związek Piłki Nożnej Sony Cup runner-up
Olejandro Oleguer Cup: 2010
Defender of the Year in Ekstraklasa: 2014–15
Eleventh of Ekstraklasa in the plebiscite of the Polish Footballers' Union: 2016
Discovery of the 2016 European Championships according to UEFA and France Football
Player of the year in the Football (Piłka Nożna) Plebiscite: 2016

References

External links

1987 births
Living people
Footballers from Kraków
Polish footballers
Poland international footballers
Association football defenders
Hutnik Nowa Huta players
Górnik Zabrze players
Jagiellonia Białystok players
Legia Warsaw players
MKE Ankaragücü footballers
Ekstraklasa players
UEFA Euro 2008 players
UEFA Euro 2016 players
2018 FIFA World Cup players
Polish expatriate footballers
Expatriate footballers in Turkey
Polish expatriate sportspeople in Turkey